Kronos Quartet Plays Terry Riley: Salome Dances for Peace is a 1989 album by the string quartet Kronos Quartet. In 1989, the album was nominated the Grammy Award for Best Classical Contemporary Composition.

Track listing

Personnel

Kronos Quartet
Hank Dutt – viola
David Harrington – violin
Joan Jeanrenaud – cello
John Sherba – violin

Production
Erwin Blumenfeld – photography
Michele Clement – photography
Henrik Drescher – illustrations
Robert Hurwitz – production
Robert C. Ludwig – mastering
Manhattan Design – art direction, design
Michael McIntyre – photography
John Newton – engineering
Frank Olinsky – art direction, design
Judith Sherman – production

References

1980s classical albums
Kronos Quartet albums
Nonesuch Records albums
1989 albums